Bairbre Dowling (born Barbara Patricia Dowling; 27 March 1953 – 20 January 2016) was an Irish actress. She appeared in films, frequently on the American stage and on US TV as well as in Irish productions.

Early life 
Dowling was born in Dublin, the daughter of actor Vincent Dowling and actress Brenda Doyle (who died in a motorcycle collision in 1981). She had three sisters, Louise, Valerie and Rachael, and a half-brother, Cian. Irish politician Richard Boyd Barrett was Dowling's biological half-brother, though this fact was not made public until after Vincent Dowling's death in 2013.

Career

Stage 
In 1970 Dowling was part of the company at the Abbey Theatre, where she appeared in The Becauseway (1970) and Rites (1973). In 1977 she worked with her father at the Great Lakes Shakespeare Festival in Cleveland, Ohio. She shared the stage with her husband Colm Meaney in And a Nightingale Sang  in 1985. She was seen on Broadway in Da by Hugh Leonard. In 2011 she appeared in a play by playwright Teresa Deevy, Temporal Powers, a Mint Theatre production presented as part of the Teresa Deevy project.

She established an ongoing presence at the Miniature Theatre of Chester in Massachusetts, often working with her father as director or co-star. In 1992 she starred in Last Tag, and in 1993 in An Audience with Fanny Kemble, a one-woman show by Anne Ludlum, based on the life of actress and writer Fanny Kemble.  In 2004, she appeared in Isobel Mahon's So Long, Sleeping Beauty, and in 2007, in The Gravity of Honey, in Dear Liar and in Is Life Worth It? in 2009.

Film, television and radio 
Dowling's first film appearance was in Francis Ford Coppola's Dementia 13 (1963). She acted with her husband in the PBS television film Playboy of the Western World in 1983,  in John Huston's 1987 film The Dead, and in the 1994 drama War of the Buttons. She also appeared in John Boorman's Zardoz (1973), and Changing Habits (1997). American television credits included roles in Murder She Wrote, Crossing Jordan, Days of our Lives, Star Trek: Voyager and ER. On RTÉ, she was known for a long-running role in The Riordans.

Dowling was a member of The California Artists Radio Theatre (CART) ensemble and performed in over 30 of their live radio plays.

Personal life 
Between 1982 and 1994, Dowling was married to actor Colm Meaney, with whom she had a daughter, Brenda, in 1984. Dowling died in 2016, aged 62, in New York.

Filmography

Film 
Dementia 13 (1963)
Zardoz (1974)
 Cry of the Innocent (television film, 1980)
 Playboy of the Western World (television film, 1983)
 The Long Journey Home (television film, 1987)
 The Dead (1987)
 War of the Buttons (1994)
 Changing Habits (1997)

Television 
 Murder, She Wrote (1995)
 ER (1997)
 Star Trek: Voyager (2000)
 Crossing Jordan (2003)
 Days of Our Lives (2007)

References

External links 

Bairbre Dowling at the Teresa Deevy Archive
Bairbre Dowling at Mint Theatre Company
Bairbre Dowling at The Abbey Theatre Archive

1953 births
2016 deaths
Actresses from Dublin (city)
Irish film actresses
Irish television actresses
20th-century Irish actresses
21st-century Irish actresses